This is the list of castles, which are located in Corsica.

 Château de Tuda, in Olmeta-di-Tuda
 Citadelle de Bonifacio, in Bonifacio
 Citadelle de Calvi, in Calvi
 Château de Coasina, in Ventiseri
 Citadelle de Corte, in Corte
 Château de la Punta, in Alata

See also

 List of castles in France

References 

 Corsica
Châteaux in Corsica
Corsica-related lists